Kerrobert is a town in west central Saskatchewan. It has a population of 970 (2021)

Kerrobert is served by Highway 21, Highway 31 and Highway 51 as well as the Canadian Pacific Railway.

History

The village began with the name of Hartsberg in 1906 which became Kerr-Robert in 1910 with a final name change in 1924 to Kerrobert.

Historic sites
Kerrobert is home to several historic buildings including the Kerrobert Water Tower (1914), the Kerrobert Library (1910) and the Kerrobert Court House

Kerrobert Court House, located in the centre of the town, was built in 1920. It was designed by the Provincial Architect Maurice W. Sharon and built by Wilson and Wilson of Regina for $145,750. The brick and stone structure was the seat of the Kerrobert Judicial District. The former courthouse is currently used as the Town of Kerrobert Municipal office.

Kerrobert Rink
Kerrobert's first rink was built in 1910. A tin covered structure was built in 1911 on the 400 block of Manitoba Ave. The arena was used by citizens of the Kerrobert area until it was destroyed in a tornado in 1919. Metal was sent flying for miles and one man was killed by the flying tin. The insurance of the rink had expired a few days before. Residents went back to skating on the slaughterhouse slough. In 1927 there was a shell built to enclose the rink. On the morning of Nov. 25, 1946 the "old blue rink" was found to be burning.
Subsequently, the provincial cabinet decided that Kerrobert would purchase and relocate one of the RCAF hangars located in North Battleford.  Construction began on the new rink in August 1947 and was finished November 11. The rink was opened Christmas Day for the first time for public skating and curling.

Demographics 

Climate
Kerrobert experiences a dry semi-arid climate. Winters are long, dry and very cold, while summers are short and warm. Precipitation is low, with an annual average of 342mm (13.5 in), and is heavily concentrated in the warmer months.

Economy
The SaskPower Ermine Power Station is located in Kerrobert, with construction planned to be completed in 2010.

Sports
Every year in March the town of Kerrobert plays host to the Kerrobert Ice Dog Rec Tournament, an ice hockey tournament.

Kerrobert is also home to SWHL all star d man Ethan Osterhold

Kerrobert is home to the Kerrobert Tigers  of the  Sask West Hockey League (SWHL).

Education

The Kerrobert High School was built in 1959. It had a gymnasium, a library, science lab, and a home economics room. The school was known around the area for its football field and the track around it.

In 1968 the Kerrobert High School was renamed the James Charteris Composite High School.  James Charteris had worked at the Kerrobert School Unit Board for 22 years. The JCCS (James Charteris Composite School) schooled grade 7-12 until 1989, when Mary Rodney School closed down and grades K-6 were incorporated into JCCS.  At this time, the school was again renamed, becoming Kerrobert Composite School or KCS.

At one time, the school's Curling Club included 20 students.  In 2003, the team won both the Provincial title and the gold medal in the Canada Winter Games. In 2005, the team won the Provincial Senior Boys Curling Championship as well.

References

External links

Progress No. 351, Saskatchewan
Towns in Saskatchewan
Division No. 13, Saskatchewan